The 2020–21 Junior ABA League was the fourth season of the Junior ABA League with eight men's under-19 teams from Bosnia and Herzegovina, Montenegro, and Serbia. Teams are the under-19 selections of the ABA League teams. The season will a single-elimination tournament held in Čajetina, Serbia from 21–24 May 2021.

Mega Soccerbet U19 won its second Junior ABA League title defeating Budućnost VOLI U19 in the final. Guard Nikola Jović was named the Junior ABA League MVP award.

Teams 
A total of 8 teams contested the league, excluding representatives from Croatia, North Macedonia, and Slovenia.

Team allocation

Locations and personnel

Venue
The  tournament will be held in Čajetina, Serbia.

Bracket

Quarterfinals
All times are local UTC+1.

Crvena zvezda mts U19 v Sloboda Užice U19

Budućnost VOLI U19 v Podgorica U19

Igokea U19 v Borac Čačak U19

Mega Soccerbet U19 v Partizan NIS U19

Semifinals

Budućnost VOLI U19 v Igokea U19

Sloboda Užice U19 v Mega Soccerbet U19

Third place game

Final

Awards

See also 
 2020–21 Euroleague Basketball Next Generation Tournament

References

External links 
 Official website
 ABA League at Eurobasket.com

U19 ABA League Championship
2020–21 in Serbian basketball
2020–21 in Bosnia and Herzegovina basketball
2020–21 in Montenegrin basketball
International youth basketball competitions hosted by Serbia
May 2021 sports events in Serbia